Rashenan (also Romanized as Rāshenān and Rāshnān) is a village in Keraj Rural District, in the Central District of Isfahan County, Isfahan Province, Iran. At the 2006 census, its population was 1,772, in 426 families.

References 

Populated places in Isfahan County